Ernst Pavel is a Romanian sprint canoeist who competed in the early 1970s. He won a complete set of medals at the ICF Canoe Sprint World Championships with a gold (K-1 4 x 500 m: 1974), a silver (K-2 1000 m: 1973), and a bronze (K-2 500 m: 1973).

References

Living people
Romanian male canoeists
Year of birth missing (living people)
ICF Canoe Sprint World Championships medalists in kayak